George Horvath (14 March 1960 – 3 May 2022) was a Swedish modern pentathlete. He competed at the 1980 Summer Olympics, winning a bronze medal in the team event.

References

External links
 

1960 births
2022 deaths
Swedish male modern pentathletes
Olympic modern pentathletes of Sweden
Modern pentathletes at the 1980 Summer Olympics
Olympic bronze medalists for Sweden
Olympic medalists in modern pentathlon
People from Danderyd Municipality
Medalists at the 1980 Summer Olympics
Sportspeople from Stockholm County
20th-century Swedish people